The Ruwe Pencil Company was an American manufacturer of woodcased pencils. Based in Greenwich, Connecticut, they were purchased by Dixon Ticonderoga in 1988.

References

External links
Durzerd Pencil Website

Pencil brands
Manufacturing companies based in Connecticut
Companies based in Greenwich, Connecticut